WOW Film Festival may refer to one of these film festivals:

For Film's Sake, formerly World of Women’s Cinema (WOW) Film Festival, in Sydney, Australia
Wales One World Film Festival, in Aberystwyth, Wales, UK